Lacera violacea is a moth of the family Erebidae. It is found on the New Hebrides and Vanuatu.

References

Moths described in 1979
Lacera
Moths of Oceania